Parbattia serrata is a moth in the family Crambidae. It was described by Eugene G. Munroe and Akira Mutuura in 1971. It is found in Sikkim, India.

References

Moths described in 1971
Pyraustinae